Marallui-ye Kalbalu (also Romanized as Mārāllūī-ye Kalbalū; also known as Marāllū and Mārāllū-ye Kalbalū) is a village in Pain Barzand Rural District, Anguti District, Germi County, Ardabil Province, Iran. At the 2006 census, its population was 110, in 20 families.

References 

Towns and villages in Germi County